The Surface Go 3 is the third generation model of the Surface Go series of devices, introduced as the successor to the Surface Go 2 by Microsoft at their Surface Event on September 22, 2021. It was announced by the company alongside the Surface Laptop Studio, Surface Pro 8, Surface Duo 2 and many Surface accessories. The tablet has the same body, the same set of cameras and speakers, the same ports, and the same dimensions as its predecessor; the main enhancement is a range of more powerful processors. The tablet is powered by the Windows 11 operating system.

Configuration

 

At launch, the Surface Go 3 was only available in one color option, platinum. A matte black color was made available on January 11, 2022 for all 8GB models. The Wi-Fi models of the tablet started shipping on October 5, 2021, while the LTE models shipped in December 2021 in North America and in Q1 2022 in other markets.

Features 

 Windows 11 operating system
 10th Gen Intel Core i3 or Pentium Gold processor (dual-core Amber Lake-Y)
 10.5 inch 1920 x 1280 display
 Windows Hello with IR camera for facial recognition logon
 Intel UHD Graphics 615 GPU
 4 GB and 8 GB RAM options
 64 GB, 128 GB, and 256 GB storage options
 A headphone jack, USB-C port, microSD card slot, and a nano SIM card tray on LTE models
 All configurations can be upgraded to Windows 11 for free or Windows 11 Pro at an additional cost
 The 8.3 mm thick tablet weighs 544 grams (1.2 pounds).

Hardware

The Surface Go 3 is the 6th addition to the lightweight 2-in-1 Surface lineup. The Surface Go 3 is aimed toward children and students. The tablet features the same magnesium alloy chassis and screen size as its predecessor.  It has one of two fanless dual-core Amber Lake-Y microarchitecture processors, the Intel Core i3-10100Y or Intel Pentium Gold 6500Y. The 6500Y is 60% faster than the previous 4425Y in the Surface Go 2. The device has a USB C port supporting power delivery and a Surface Connect port. The front-facing camera assembly has an infrared sensor that supports login via Windows Hello.

A detachable keyboard uses an 8-pin connection which is compatible with the previous Surface Go models and retails at $99.

Software 

Surface Go 3 is powered by Windows 11 Home in S Mode by default with a 30-day trial of Microsoft 365; however, this can be opted out of and upgraded to Home for free or Pro for a fee.

The device also supports Windows Hello login using a biometric facial recognition.

Timeline

References

External link
 
 
 

Tablet computers introduced in 2021
Microsoft Surface
2-in-1 PCs